is a free-to-play hack and slash video game developed by Grasshopper Manufacture and published by GungHo Online Entertainment. The game was released for the PlayStation 4 in December 2016, and in Japan in February 2017. It was released for Microsoft Windows in September 2018.

A battle royale game sequel titled Deathverse: Let It Die was announced in October 2021 and had a limited time beta test in May and June 2022. It was developed by Supertrick Games, a game studio spun off of Grasshopper Manufacture, who developed the original game.

Gameplay
Under the supervision of a skateboarding grim reaper called Uncle Death, players fight through a treacherous tower, obtaining various types of weapons and armor while finding creatures and mushrooms to eat in order to stay alive. Upon death, a player's “death data” is then circulated among other player's games where they will appear as formidable opponents. The sharing of “death data” is one of the various asynchronous multiplayer elements that can be found in the game.

The fighting mechanics are similar to the popular role-playing game Dark Souls.

Development
Let It Die was originally known as "'Lily Bergamo". Its initial plot focused on a female protagonist called Tae Ioroi and was set in the year 2026. The game's world drew from both Japanese and Western cultures. It was described as a "super action game" or an "extreme action game". The game was supposed to feature an "element of growth", in that by gradually accumulating experience, the player's data is updated more and more rapidly. Lily Bergamo would have featured online play and features, though details were currently still unknown.

In addition to the game, Lily Bergamo would feature a "companion app", which would be playable on smartphones. The game would feature online play, and according to GungHo Online Entertainment's CEO Kazuki Morishita, would allow "both smartphone and PlayStation gamers to be in the same world”. According to Morishita, Grasshopper Manufacture "wants to make the most out of the strengths of online play, and the idea of using smartphones to play has been a big deal”, with the goal of the app being the ability for players "to completely rely on their smartphones to play".

Although Lily Bergamo changed to Let It Die during the Electronic Entertainment Expo 2014, the concept of an "extreme action game" remained. The change commenced around the end of 2013. Executive director Goichi Suda explained that the concept of death is relevant throughout the game, and that if one player dies in a game, they will appear in another player's game, making the deaths of players important in the experience of the game, hence the title. The game will have normal AI enemies and dead player characters' avatars, and will also be free-to-play. The game represents a huge departure from Suda's past video games in terms of creative philosophy.

Lily Bergamo was to be the first game to be developed by Grasshopper Manufacture after it was acquired by GungHo Online Entertainment. Suda stated that Lily Bergamo was conceived after GungHo CEO Kazuki Morishita expressed his desire to "make a game that leverages the inherent flavor of both companies.” The game was revealed in April 2013, and in Sony Computer Entertainment Japan Asia's Press Conference on September 9, 2013, the release date was set to sometime in 2014. Additional information was shown at the 2013 Tokyo Game Show, including the name of the protagonist, the ability to play on smartphones and the game's setting. At the game show, a special stage event was held for Lily Bergamo, including a cosplay model dressed up as the game's protagonist Tae Ioroi, and specially-made Lily Bergamo stickers were distributed. Although the game was not playable then, Suda promised that it would be at the 2014 Tokyo Game Show instead. Yusuke Kozaki was the head of character design in Lily Bergamo, along with direction by Nobutaka Ichiki and game design by Yusuke Kozaki. A trademark for Lily Bergamo had been filed in North America, which hinted at a soon-to-be confirmed release in that region and globally.

On June 11, 2014, at the Electronic Entertainment Expo 2014, Lily Bergamo was transformed into Let It Die. GungHo Online Entertainment had trademarked Lily Bergamo in the United States, hinting at a possible global release, with the reveal of Let It Die confirming it. On October 29, 2015, GungHo Online Entertainment announced that Let It Die had been delayed, and that it would now launch in 2016 instead of its originally planned 2015 release window. On December 3, 2016, Let It Die was released for free on PlayStation Network in North America and Europe.

Let It Die featured 100 Japanese artists in the rock and metal music genres curated by Silent Hill series game music composer Akira Yamaoka, who described the work as a "one-of-a-kind musical experience".

Reception

Let It Die received "mixed or average" reviews, according to video game review aggregator Metacritic. In February 2017, it was announced that the game has been downloaded over two million times. By April 2018, that number had risen to over four million. In March 2020, it was announced that the game has over six million downloads.

Notes

References

External links

2016 video games
Free-to-play video games
Grasshopper Manufacture games
Metafictional video games
Video games about personifications of death
PlayStation 4 games
PlayStation 4 Pro enhanced games
Single-player video games
Unreal Engine games
Video games about skeletons
Video games about video games
Video games developed in Japan
Video games featuring female protagonists
Windows games